The 2003 South American Under-17 Football Championship was played in Bolivia from 1 to 18 May 2003.

The competition was originally scheduled for February 28-March 16 in Venezuela, Maracay - it was postponed to May and moved to Santa Cruz de la Sierra, Bolivia due to social unrest in Venezuela;
Venezuela were awarded the organisation of the 2005 edition instead.

The host of the competition were the cities of Santa Cruz and Montero.

First round
The 10 national teams were divided in 2 groups of 5 teams each. The top 2 teams qualified for the final round.

Group A

Group B

Final round
The final round were played in the same system that first round, with the best 4 teams.

Argentina, Brazil and Colombia qualify to 2003 FIFA U-17 World Championship.

Top goalscorers

South American Under-17 Football Championship
Under
International association football competitions hosted by Bolivia
Under-17
2003 in youth association football